Kiril Pavlovski (born September 18, 1983) is a Macedonian professional basketball center who last played for Rabotnički of the Macedonian First League.

References

External links
 
 
 
 

1983 births
Living people
Sportspeople from Skopje
Macedonian men's basketball players
KK Rabotnički players
KK Crvena zvezda players
KK Vardar players
AEK Larnaca B.C. players
Centers (basketball)
Macedonian expatriate basketball people in Serbia